Kerby Jean-Raymond is a Haitian American fashion designer who is the founder of the  menswear label Pyer Moss.

Career 
Kerby Jean-Raymond first came into the spotlight for his presentation of Pyer Moss' Spring 2016 Menswear Collection during New York Fashion Week.
The show highlighted police brutality, referencing the Black Lives Matter movement through use of video, street art, and fashion. Despite receiving backlash for his display, Jean-Raymond uses his platform promote positive social change. Jean-Raymond has made public comments about his experience as a teenage victim of driving while black. Kerby Jean-Raymond collaborated with R&B singer and activist Erykah Badu who styled Jean-Raymond's Pyer Moss AW16 line for the 2016 New York Fashion Week show. The featured collection was titled "Double Bind."

His brand, Pyer Moss, won the FGI Rising Star Award in the menswear category in 2014.  Also in 2014, he was a finalist in the DHL Exported Prize presented by IMG Worldwide.  He was recognized by the Forbes "30 Under 30" list in 2015. Jean-Raymond was featured on Cultured Magazines fashion issue cover in April 2019.

During Paris Fashion Week in February 2019, Odell Beckham Jr. wore a Pyer Moss Collection 2 hoodie. Others who have been seen in Pyer Moss include producer Swizz Beatz, Kiandra Layne, Gabrielle Union-Wade, Colin Kaepernick and First Lady Michelle Obama.

In September 2020, Jean-Raymond was named Global Creative Director of sportswear brand Reebok. His label Pyer Moss was also awarded the top prize at the fifteenth CFDA/Vogue Fashion Fund awards that same month. In March 2022, he departed Reebok.

Background 
Listed in Forbes 2015 "30 Under 30" in Art And Style, Jean-Raymond began designing at a young age. He landed his first apprenticeship at 14 years old while still attending The High School of Fashion Industries in Manhattan. He started his first fashion label called Mary's Jungle at the age of 15. Taught by Kay Unger, Jean-Raymond worked on Unger's first women's evening collection.

He launched Pyer Moss in 2013. Jean-Raymond makes use of his brand by addressing racial tensions in the United States and intertwining social issues with the fashion world. He describes his brand, Pyer Moss, as an "art project" or "a timely social experiment" at times.

References

Further reading 

 

Living people
American fashion designers
American people of Haitian descent
Year of birth missing (living people)
High fashion brands